Scopula is a genus of moths in the family Geometridae described by Franz von Paula Schrank in 1802.

Species
It has 705 species which are listed here alphabetically.

A

Scopula ablativa (Dognin, 1911)
Scopula abolita Herbulot, [1956]
Scopula abornata (Guenée, [1858])
Scopula accentuata (Guenée, [1858])
Scopula acentra (Warren, 1897)
Scopula acharis Prout, 1938
Scopula achroa (Lower, 1902)
Scopula achrosta Prout, 1935
Scopula acidalia (Holland, 1894)
Scopula acinosa (Prout, 1932)
Scopula actuaria (Walker, 1861)
Scopula acutanellus Herbulot, 1992
Scopula acyma Prout, 1932
Scopula addictaria (Walker, 1861)
Scopula adelpharia (Püngeler, 1894)
Scopula adenensis (Wiltshire, 1986)
Scopula adeptaria (Walker, 1861)
Scopula aegrefasciata Sihvonen, 2001
Scopula aemulata (Hulst, 1896) – angled wave
Scopula aequidistans (Warren, 1896)
Scopula aequifasciata (Christoph, 1881)
Scopula aetheomorpha Prout, 1917
Scopula afghana (Ebert, 1965)
Scopula africana Berio, 1937
Scopula agglomerata Herbulot, 1992
Scopula agnes (Butler, 1886)
Scopula agrapta (Warren, 1902)
Scopula agrata (Felder & Rogenhofer, 1875)
Scopula agutsaensis Vasilenko, 1997
Scopula alargata (Dognin, 1901)
Scopula alba (Hausmann, 1993)
Scopula albiceraria (Herrich-Schäffer, 1847)
Scopula albida (Warren, 1899)
Scopula albidaria (Staudinger, 1901)
Scopula albidulata (Warren, 1897)
Scopula albiflava (Warren, 1896)
Scopula albilarvata (Warren, 1899)
Scopula albivertex (Swinhoe, 1892)
Scopula albomaculata (Moore, 1888)
Scopula alboverticata (Warren, 1895)
Scopula aleuritis (Turner, 1908)
Scopula alfierii (Wiltshire, 1949)
Scopula alma Prout, 1920
Scopula alstoni Prout, 1919
Scopula amala (Meyrick, 1886)
Scopula amazonata (Guenée, [1858])
Scopula ambigua Prout, 1935
Scopula amphiphracta Prout, 1938
Scopula amseli Wiltshire, 1967
Scopula anaitisaria (Walker, 1861)
Scopula anatreces Prout, 1920
Scopula ancellata (Hulst, 1887)
Scopula andalusiaria (Wagner, 1935)
Scopula andresi (Draudt, 1912)
Scopula anfractata Sihvonen, 2005
Scopula angusticallis Prout, 1935
Scopula aniara Prout, 1934
Scopula anisopleura Inoue, 1982
Scopula annexata Prout, 1938
Scopula annubiata (Staudinger, 1892)
Scopula annularia (Swinhoe, 1890)
Scopula anoista (Prout, 1915)
Scopula ansorgei (Warren, 1899)
Scopula ansulata (Lederer, 1871)
Scopula antankarana Herbulot, [1956]
Scopula antiloparia (Wallengren, 1863)
Scopula anysima Prout, 1938
Scopula aphercta Prout, 1932
Scopula apicipunctata (Christoph, 1881)
Scopula apparitaria (Walker, 1861)
Scopula arenosaria (Staudinger, 1879)
Scopula argentidisca (Warren, 1902)
Scopula argillina (Lower, 1915)
Scopula argyroleuca (Hampson, 1910)
Scopula asellaria (Herrich-Schäffer, 1847)
Scopula asiatica (Brandt, 1938)
Scopula asopiata (Guenée, [1858])
Scopula asparta Prout, 1938
Scopula aspiciens Prout, 1926
Scopula aspilataria (Walker, 1861)
Scopula asthena Inoue, 1943
Scopula astheniata Viidalepp, 2005
Scopula astrabes Prout, 1932
Scopula asymmetrica Holloway, 1997
Scopula atramentaria (Bastelberger, 1909)
Scopula atricapilla Prout, 1934
Scopula atriceps (Hampson, 1895)
Scopula atridiscata (Warren, 1897)
Scopula attentata (Walker, 1861)
Scopula axiata (Püngeler, 1909)
Scopula axiotis (Meyrick, 1888)

B

Scopula batesi Prout, 1932
Scopula beccarii (Prout, 1915)
Scopula beckeraria (Lederer, 1853)
Scopula benenotata Prout, 1932
Scopula benguetensis Prout, 1931
Scopula benigna (Brandt, 1941)
Scopula benitaria (Barnes & McDunnough, 1913)
Scopula bifalsaria (Prout, 1913)
Scopula bigeminata (Warren, 1897)
Scopula bimacularia (Leech, 1897)
Scopula bispurcata (Warren, 1898)
Scopula bistrigata (Pagenstecher, 1907)
Scopula brachypus Prout, 1926
Scopula brookesae Holloway, 1976
Scopula bullata (Vojnits, 1986)
Scopula butleri (Prout, 1913)
Scopula butyrosa (Warren, 1893)

C

Scopula caberaria Herbulot, 1992
Scopula cacuminaria (Morrison, 1874) – frosted tan wave
Scopula caducaria (Swinhoe, 1904)
Scopula caeria Prout, 1938
Scopula caesaria (Walker, 1861)
Scopula cajanderi (Herz, 1903)
Scopula calcarata D. S. Fletcher, 1958
Scopula caledonica Holloway, 1979
Scopula callibotrys (Prout, 1918)
Scopula calothysanis Herbulot, 1965
Scopula calotis (Dyar, 1912)
Scopula campbelli Prout, 1920
Scopula candida Prout, 1934
Scopula candidaria (Warren, 1902)
Scopula canularia (Herrich-Schäffer, 1870)
Scopula capnosterna Prout, 1938
Scopula caricaria (Reutti, 1853)
Scopula carnosa Prout, 1925
Scopula cassiaria (Swinhoe, 1904)
Scopula cassioides Prout, 1932
Scopula castissima (Warren, 1897)
Scopula cavana (Druce, 1892)
Scopula celebraria (Walker, 1861)
Scopula cervinata (Warren, 1905)
Scopula cesa Kemal & Kocak, 2004
Scopula chalcographata (Brandt, 1938)
Scopula chionaeata (Herrich-Schäffer, 1870)
Scopula chrysoparalias (Prout, 1917)
Scopula chydaea Prout, 1938
Scopula cineraria (Leech, 1897)
Scopula cinnamomata D. S. Fletcher, 1955
Scopula circumpunctata (Warren, 1898)
Scopula clandestina Herbulot, [1956]
Scopula clarivialis Prout, 1931
Scopula cleoraria (Walker, 1861)
Scopula coangulata Prout, 1920
Scopula coenona (Turner, 1908)
Scopula colymbas Herbulot, 1994
Scopula comes Prout, 1927
Scopula commaria (Swinhoe, 1904)
Scopula compensata (Walker, 1861)
Scopula complanata (Warren, 1896)
Scopula concinnaria (Duponchel, 1842)
Scopula concolor (Warren, 1905)
Scopula concurrens (Warren, 1897)
Scopula conduplicata (Warren, 1904)
Scopula confertaria (Walker, 1861)
Scopula confinaria (Herrich-Schäffer, 1847)
Scopula confusa (Butler, 1878)
Scopula congruata (Zeller, 1847)
Scopula coniargyris Prout, 1932
Scopula coniaria (Prout, 1913)
Scopula conotaria (Schaus, 1901)
Scopula conscensa (Swinhoe, 1886)
Scopula consimilata (Warren, 1896)
Scopula conspersa (Warren, 1900)
Scopula conspicillaria Karisch, 2001
Scopula contramutata Prout, 1920
Scopula convergens (Warren, 1904)
Scopula convictorata (Snellen, 1874)
Scopula cornishi Prout, 1932
Scopula corrivalaria (Kretschmar, 1862)
Scopula corrupta Prout, 1931
Scopula costata (Moore, [1887])
Scopula coundularia (Warren, 1898)
Scopula crassipuncta (Warren, 1901)
Scopula crawshayi Prout, 1932
Scopula cumulata (Alphéraky, 1883)
Scopula cuneilinea (Walker, [1863])
Scopula curvimargo (Warren, 1900)

D

Scopula dapharia (Swinhoe, 1904)
Scopula dargei Herbulot, 1992
Scopula declinata Herbulot, 1972
Scopula decolor (Staudinger, 1898)
Scopula decorata ([Denis & Schiffermüller], 1775)
Scopula defectiscripta (Prout, 1914)
Scopula defixaria (Walker, 1861)
Scopula deflavaria (Warren, 1896)
Scopula deflavarioides Holloway, 1997
Scopula dehortata (Dognin, 1901)
Scopula deiliniata (Warren, 1897)
Scopula deliciosaria (Walker, 1861)
Scopula delitata (Prout, 1913)
Scopula delospila (Warren, 1907)
Scopula demissaria (Walker, [1863])
Scopula densicornis (Warren, 1897)
Scopula dentilinea (Warren, 1897)
Scopula dentisignata (Walker, [1863])
Scopula derasata (Walker, [1863])
Scopula deserta (Warren, 1897)
Scopula desita (Walker, 1861)
Scopula despoliata (Walker, 1861)
Scopula destituta (Walker, 1866)
Scopula detentata Prout, 1926
Scopula dhofarata Wiltshire, 1986
Scopula didymosema (Lower, 1893)
Scopula diffinaria (Prout, 1913)
Scopula dignata (Guenée, [1858])
Scopula dimoera Prout, 1922
Scopula dimoeroides Herbulot, [1956]
Scopula dimorphata (Snellen, 1881)
Scopula disclusaria (Christoph, 1881)
Scopula discrepans Prout, 1916
Scopula dismutata (Guenée, [1858])
Scopula disparata (Hampson, 1903)
Scopula dissonans (Warren, 1897)
Scopula divisaria (Walker, 1861)
Scopula dohertyi (Warren, 1897)
Scopula donaria (Schaus, 1901)
Scopula donovani (Distant, 1892)
Scopula dorsinigrata (Warren, 1904)
Scopula dotina Prout, 1938
Scopula drenowskii Sterneck, 1941
Scopula dubernardi (Oberthür 1923)
Scopula duplicipuncta (Prout, 1913)
Scopula duplinupta Inoue, 1982
Scopula dux Prout, 1927
Scopula dysmorpha (Prout, 1915)

E

Scopula eburneata (Guenée, [1858])
Scopula eclipes (Prout, 1910)
Scopula ectopostigma Prout, 1932
Scopula elegans (Prout, 1915)
Scopula elegantula Herbulot, 1978
Scopula eleina Prout, 1938
Scopula elisabethae Prout, 1934
Scopula elwesi Prout, 1922
Scopula emissaria (Walker, 1861)
Scopula emutaria (Hübner, [1809])
Scopula emma (Prout 1913)
Scopula enucloides (Schaus, 1901)
Scopula epigypsa (Meyrick, 1886)
Scopula epiorrhoe Prout, 1935
Scopula episcia (Meyrick, 1888)
Scopula episticta Turner, 1942
Scopula erebospila (Lower, 1902)
Scopula erici (Kirby, 1896)
Scopula erinaria (Swinhoe, 1904)
Scopula erlangeri (Prout, 1932)
Scopula erubescens (Warren, 1895)
Scopula erymna Prout, 1928
Scopula euchroa Prout, 1925
Scopula eulomata (Snellen, 1877)
Scopula eunupta Vasilenko, 1998
Scopula euphemia Prout, 1920
Scopula eurata (Prout, 1913)
Scopula extimaria (Walker, 1861)

F

Scopula falcataria (Warren, 1901)
Scopula falcovitshi Viidalepp, 1992
Scopula falsaria (Herrich-Schäffer, 1852)
Scopula farinaria (Leech, 1897)
Scopula fernaria Schaus, 1940
Scopula ferrilineata (Moore, 1888)
Scopula ferruginea (Hampson, 1893)
Scopula fibulata (Guenée, [1858])
Scopula fimbrilineata (Warren, 1902)
Scopula flaccata (Staudinger, 1898)
Scopula flaccidaria (Zeller, 1852)
Scopula flavifurfurata Prout, 1920
Scopula flavinsolata Holloway, 1997
Scopula flavissima (Warren, 1898)
Scopula flavorosearia (Shchetkin, 1956)
Scopula flexio Prout, 1917
Scopula floslactata (Haworth, 1809)
Scopula fluidaria (Swinhoe, 1886)
Scopula forbesi (Druce, 1884)
Scopula formosana Prout, 1934
Scopula fragilis (Warren, 1903)
Scopula francki Prout, 1935
Scopula frigidaria (Möschler, 1860)
Scopula froitzheimi Wiltshire, 1967
Scopula fucata (Püngeler, 1909)
Scopula fulminataria (Turati, 1927)
Scopula fulvicolor Hampson, 1899
Scopula fumosaria (Prout, 1913)
Scopula furfurata (Warren, 1897)
Scopula fuscata (Hulst, 1887)
Scopula fuscescens Prout, 1934
Scopula fuscobrunnea (Warren, 1901)

G

Scopula galactina D. S. Fletcher, 1978
Scopula gastonaria (Oberthür, 1876)
Scopula gazellaria (Wallengren, 1863)
Scopula gibbivalvata Herbulot, 1972
Scopula gilva Sato, 1993
Scopula glaucescens Herbulot, 1978
Scopula gnou Herbulot, 1985
Scopula gracilis (Brandt, 1941)
Scopula graphidata Prout, 1920
Scopula grasuta (Schaus, 1901)
Scopula griseolineata (Rothschild, 1915)
Scopula grisescens (Staudinger, 1892)
Scopula guancharia (Alphéraky, 1889)

H

Scopula habilis (Warren, 1899)
Scopula hackeri Hausmann, 1999
Scopula haemaleata (Warren, 1898)
Scopula haematophaga Bänziger & Fletcher, 1985
Scopula haeretica Herbulot, [1956]
Scopula halimodendrata (Erschoff, 1874)
Scopula hanna (Butler, 1878)
Scopula harteni Hausmann, 2009
Scopula heba Prout, 1920
Scopula hectata (Guenée, [1858])
Scopula heidra Debauche, 1938
Scopula helcita (Linnaeus, 1763)
Scopula herbuloti Karisch, 2001
Scopula herbuloti (Viette, 1977)
Scopula hesycha Prout, 1919
Scopula hoerhammeri Brandt, 1941
Scopula homaema Prout, 1920
Scopula homodoxa (Meyrick, 1886)
Scopula honestata (Mabille, 1869)
Scopula horiochroea (Prout, 1916)
Scopula humifusaria (Eversmann, 1837)
Scopula humilis (Prout, 1913)
Scopula hyphenophora (Warren, 1896)
Scopula hypocallista (Lower, 1900)
Scopula hypochra (Meyrick, 1888)

I

Scopula ichinosawana (Matsumura, 1925)
Scopula idearia (Swinhoe, 1886)
Scopula idnothogramma Prout, 1938
Scopula ignobilis (Warren, 1901)
Scopula imitaria (Hübner, [1799])
Scopula immistaria (Herrich-Schäffer, 1852)
Scopula immorata (Linnaeus, 1758)
Scopula immutata (Linnaeus, 1758)
Scopula impersonata (Walker, 1861)
Scopula impicta Prout, 1922
Scopula improba (Warren, 1899)
Scopula impropriaria (Walker, 1861)
Scopula inactuosa Prout, 1920
Scopula inangulata (Warren, 1896)
Scopula incalcarata D. S. Fletcher, 1958
Scopula incanata (Linnaeus, 1758)
Scopula indicataria (Walker, 1861)
Scopula inductata (Guenée, [1858]) – soft-lined wave
Scopula infantilis Herbulot, 1970
Scopula inficita (Walker, 1866)
Scopula inflexibilis Prout, 1931
Scopula infota (Warren, 1897)
Scopula innocens (Butler, 1886)
Scopula innominata Schaus, 1940
Scopula inscriptata (Walker, [1863])
Scopula insincera Prout, 1920
Scopula instructata (Walker, 1863)
Scopula intensata (Moore, 1887)
Scopula internata (Guenée, [1858])
Scopula internataria (Walker, 1861)
Scopula iranaria Bytinski-Salz & Brandt, 1937
Scopula irrorata (Bethune-Baker, 1891)
Scopula irrubescens Prout, 1934
Scopula irrufata (Warren, 1905)
Scopula isodesma (Lower, 1903)
Scopula isomala Prout, 1932
Scopula isomerica Prout, 1922
Scopula iterata Herbulot, 1978

J-K

Scopula jacta (Swinhoe, 1885)
Scopula jejuna Prout, 1932
Scopula johnsoni D. S. Fletcher, 1958
Scopula julietae Robinson, 1975
Scopula junctaria (Walker, 1861) – simple wave
Scopula juruana (Butler, 1881)
Scopula kagiata (Bastelberger, 1909)
Scopula karischi Herbulot, 1999
Scopula kashmirensis (Moore, 1888)
Scopula kawabei Inoue, 1982
Scopula klaphecki Prout, 1922
Scopula kohor Herbulot & Viette, 1952
Scopula kounden Herbulot, 1992
Scopula kuhitangica Vasilenko, 1998
Scopula kuldschaensis (Alphéraky, 1883)

L

Scopula lacriphaga Bänziger & Fletcher, 1985
Scopula lactaria (Walker, 1861)
Scopula lactarioides Brandt, 1941
Scopula lactea (Warren, 1900)
Scopula laevipennis (Warren, 1897)
Scopula laresaria Schaus, 1940
Scopula larseni (Wiltshire, 1982)
Scopula latelineata (Graeser, 1892)
Scopula lathraea Prout, 1922
Scopula latifera (Walker, 1869)
Scopula latimediata D. S. Fletcher, 1958
Scopula latitans Prout, 1920
Scopula lautaria (Hübner, [1831]) – small frosted wave
Scopula lechrioloma (Turner, 1908)
Scopula legrandi Herbulot, [1963]
Scopula lehmanni Hausmann, 1991
Scopula leucoloma Prout, 1932
Scopula leucopis Prout, 1926
Scopula leuculata (Snellen, 1874)
Scopula leuraria (Prout, 1913)
Scopula libyssa (Hopffer, 1858)
Scopula limbata (Wileman, 1915)
Scopula limboundata (Haworth, 1809) – large lace-border
Scopula limosata D. S. Fletcher, 1963
Scopula linearia (Hampson, 1891)
Scopula liotis (Meyrick, 1888)
Scopula longicerata Inoue, 1955
Scopula longitarsata Prout, 1932
Scopula loxographa Turner, 1941
Scopula loxosema (Turner, 1908)
Scopula lubricata (Warren, 1905)
Scopula ludibunda (Prout, 1915)
Scopula lugubriata D. S. Fletcher, 1958
Scopula luridata (Zeller, 1847)
Scopula lutearia (Leech, 1897)
Scopula luteicollis Prout, 1938
Scopula luteolata (Hulst, 1880)
Scopula luxipuncta Prout, 1932
Scopula lydia (Butler, 1886)

M

Scopula macrocelis (Prout, 1915)
Scopula macronephes D. S. Fletcher, 1958
Scopula magnidiscata (Warren, 1904)
Scopula magnipunctata D. S. Fletcher, 1958
Scopula malagasy (Viette, 1977)
Scopula malayana Bänziger & Fletcher, 1985
Scopula manengouba Herbulot, 1992
Scopula manes Djakonov, 1936
Scopula manifesta (Prout 1911)
Scopula mappata (Guenée, [1858])
Scopula marcidaria (Leech, 1897)
Scopula margaritaria (Warren, 1900)
Scopula marginepunctata (Goeze, 1781)
Scopula mariarosae (Expósito, 2006)
Scopula mascula (Bastelberger, 1909)
Scopula mecysma (Swinhoe, 1894)
Scopula megalocentra (Meyrick, 1888)
Scopula megalostigma (Prout, 1915)
Scopula melanopis (Prout, 1929)
Scopula melanstigma Prout, 1938
Scopula melinau Holloway, 1997
Scopula mendax Herbulot, 1954
Scopula mendicaria (Leech, 1897)
Scopula mentzeri (Hausmann, 1993)
Scopula menytes Prout, 1935
Scopula merina Herbulot, [1956]
Scopula mesophaena Prout, 1923
Scopula metacosmia Prout, 1932
Scopula micara (Schaus, 1901)
Scopula michinoku Sato, 1994
Scopula micrata (Guenée, [1858])
Scopula microphylla (Meyrick, 1889)
Scopula minoa (Prout, 1916)
Scopula minorata (Boisduval, 1833)
Scopula minuta (Warren, 1900)
Scopula misera (Walker, 1866)
Scopula mishmica Prout, 1938
Scopula modesta (Moore, [1887])
Scopula modicaria (Leech, 1897)
Scopula moinieri Herbulot, 1966
Scopula molaris Prout, 1922
Scopula mollicula Prout, 1932
Scopula monosema Prout, 1923
Scopula monotropa Prout, 1925
Scopula montivaga Prout, 1922
Scopula moorei (Cotes & Swinhoe, 1888)
Scopula moralesi (Rungs, 1945)
Scopula mustangensis Yazaki, 1995

N

Scopula nacida (Dognin, 1901)
Scopula napariata (Guenée, [1858])
Scopula natalensis (Prout, 1915)
Scopula natalica (Butler, 1875)
Scopula nebulata D. S. Fletcher, 1963
Scopula nemoraria (Hübner, [1799])
Scopula nemorivagata Wallengren, 1863
Scopula neophyta Prout, 1922
Scopula neoxesta (Meyrick, 1888)
Scopula nepalensis Inoue, 1982
Scopula nepheloperas (Prout, 1916)
Scopula nephotropa Prout, 1931
Scopula nesciaria (Walker, 1861)
Scopula nesciaroides Holloway, 1997
Scopula nigralba Herbulot, 1978
Scopula nigricornis Herbulot, 1992
Scopula nigricosta (Prout, 1916)
Scopula nigridentata (Warren, 1896)
Scopula nigrifrons Pajni & Walia
Scopula nigrinotata (Warren, 1897)
Scopula nigristellata (Warren, 1898)
Scopula nigrocellata (Warren, 1899)
Scopula nigrociliata Ebert, 1965
Scopula nigropunctata (Hufnagel, 1767)
Scopula nipha D. S. Fletcher, 1955
Scopula nitidata (Warren, 1905)
Scopula nitidissima Prout, 1920
Scopula nivearia (Leech, 1897)
Scopula normalis Herbulot, [1956]
Scopula nostima Prout, 1938
Scopula nubifera Hausmann, 1998
Scopula nucleata (Warren, 1905)
Scopula nupta (Butler, 1878)

O

Scopula obliquifascia Herbulot, 1999
Scopula obliquiscripta (Warren, 1897)
Scopula obliquisignata (Bastelberger, 1909)
Scopula obliviaria (Walker, 1861)
Scopula ocellata (Warren, 1899)*
Scopula ocellicincta (Warren, 1901)
Scopula ocheracea (Hampson, 1891)
Scopula ochraceata (Staudinger, 1901)
Scopula ochrea (Hausmann, 2006)
Scopula ochreofusa (Warren, 1899)
Scopula ochreolata (Warren, 1905)
Scopula ochricrinita Prout, 1920
Scopula ochrifrons Prout, 1920
Scopula oenoloma Prout, 1932
Scopula oliveta Prout, 1920
Scopula omana Wilthsire, 1977
Scopula omissa (Warren, 1906)
Scopula omnisona Prout, 1915
Scopula ophthalmica Prout, 1920
Scopula opicata (Fabricius, 1798)
Scopula opperta Prout, 1920
Scopula oppilata (Walker, 1861)
Scopula oppunctata (Warren, 1902)
Scopula optivata (Walker, 1861)
Scopula orbeorum (Hausmann, 1996)
Scopula ordinaria (Dyar, 1912)
Scopula ordinata (Walker, 1861)
Scopula orientalis (Alphéraky, 1876)
Scopula origalis (Brandt, 1941)
Scopula ornata (Scopoli, 1763)
Scopula orthoscia (Meyrick, 1888)
Scopula oryx Herbulot, 1985
Scopula ossicolor (Warren, 1897)
Scopula ourebi Herbulot, 1985
Scopula oxysticha Prout, 1938
Scopula oxystoma Prout, 1929

P-Q

Scopula paetula Prout, 1919
Scopula palleuca Prout, 1925
Scopula pallida (Warren, 1888)
Scopula pallidiceps (Warren, 1898)
Scopula pallidilinea (Warren, 1897)
Scopula palpata (Prout, 1932)
Scopula palpifera Prout, 1925
Scopula paneliusi Herbulot, 1957
Scopula paradela Prout, 1920
Scopula paradelpharia Prout, 1920
Scopula parallelaria (Warren, 1901)
Scopula parodites Prout, 1931
Scopula parvimacula (Warren, 1896)
Scopula patularia (Walker, 1866)
Scopula pauperata (Walker, 1861)
Scopula pedilata (Felder & Rogenhofer, 1875)
Scopula pelloniodes Prout, 1922
Scopula penricei Prout, 1920
Scopula penultima Herbulot, 1992
Scopula peractaria (Walker, 1866)
Scopula perialurga (Turner, 1922)
Scopula perlata (Walker, 1861)
Scopula perlimbata (Snellen, 1874)
Scopula permutata (Staudinger, 1897)
Scopula perornata (Thierry-Mieg, 1905)
Scopula perpunctata Herbulot, 1992
Scopula personata (Prout, 1913)
Scopula perstrigulata (Prout, 1913)
Scopula pertinax (Prout, 1916)
Scopula phallarcuata Holloway, 1997
Scopula phyletis (Prout, 1913)
Scopula phyxelis Prout, 1938
Scopula picta (Warren, 1897)
Scopula pinguis (Swinhoe, 1902)
Scopula pirimacula (Prout, 1916)
Scopula pithogona Prout, 1938*
Scopula placida (Warren, 1905)
Scopula planidisca (Bastelberger, 1908)
Scopula planipennis (Warren, 1900)
Scopula plantagenaria (Hulst, 1887)
Scopula plionocentra Prout, 1920
Scopula plumbearia (Leech, 1891)
Scopula poliodesma (Turner, 1908)
Scopula polystigmaria (Hampson, 1903)
Scopula polyterpes Prout, 1920
Scopula praecanata (Staudinger, 1896)
Scopula praesignipuncta Prout, 1920
Scopula pratana (Fabricius, 1794)
Scopula preumenes Prout, 1938
Scopula prisca Herbulot, [1956]
Scopula privata (Walker, 1861)
Scopula promethes Prout, 1928
Scopula propinquaria (Leech, 1897)
Scopula prosoeca (Turner, 1908)
Scopula prosthiostigma Prout, 1938
Scopula protecta Herbulot, [1956]
Scopula proterocelis Prout, 1920
Scopula prouti Djakonov, 1935
Scopula proximaria (Leech, 1897)
Scopula pruinata D. S. Fletcher, 1958
Scopula psephis Prout, 1935
Scopula pseudagrata Holloway, 1997
Scopula pseudoafghana Ebert, 1965
Scopula pseudocorrivalaria (Wehrli, 1932)
Scopula pseudodoxa Prout, 1920
Scopula pseudophema Prout, 1920
Scopula pudicaria (Motschulsky, [1861])
Scopula puerca (Dognin, 1901)
Scopula pulchellata (Fabricius, 1794)
Scopula pulverosa Prout, 1934
Scopula punctatissima (Bastelberger, 1911)
Scopula puncticosta (Walker, 1869)
Scopula punctilineata (Warren, 1897)
Scopula purata (Guenée, [1858]) – chalky wave
Scopula pyraliata (Warren, 1898)
Scopula pyrrhochra (Prout, 1916)
Scopula quadratisparsa Holloway, 1976
Scopula quadrifasciata (Bastelberger, 1909)
Scopula quadrilineata (Packard, 1876) – four-lined wave
Scopula quinquefasciata Holloway, 1979
Scopula quinquestriata (Warren, 1896)
Scopula quintaria (Prout, 1916)

R

Scopula radiata (Warren, 1897)
Scopula rantaizanensis (Wileman, 1915)
Scopula reaumuraria (Milliere, 1864)
Scopula rebaptisa Herbulot, 1985
Scopula rectisecta Prout, 1920
Scopula recurvata Herbulot, 1992
Scopula recurvinota (Warren, 1902)
Scopula recusataria (Walker, 1861)
Scopula regenerata (Fabricius, 1794)
Scopula relictata (Walker, 1866)
Scopula remotata (Guenée, [1858])
Scopula restricta Holloway, 1997
Scopula retracta (Hausmann, 2006)
Scopula rhodinaria (Rebel, 1907)
Scopula rhodocraspeda Prout, 1932
Scopula riedeli Hausmann, 2006
Scopula risa Wiltshire, 1982
Scopula rivularia (Leech, 1897)
Scopula roezaria (Swinhoe, 1904)
Scopula romanarioides (Rothschild, 1913)
Scopula roseocincta (Warren, 1899)
Scopula rossi (Prout, 1913)
Scopula rostrilinea (Warren, 1900)
Scopula rubellata (Staudinger, 1871)
Scopula rubiginata (Hufnagel, 1767)
Scopula rubraria (Doubleday, 1843)
Scopula rubriceps (Warren, 1905)
Scopula rubrocinctata (Guenée, [1858])
Scopula rubrosignaria (Mabille, 1900)
Scopula ruficolor Prout, 1916
Scopula rufigrisea Prout, 1913
Scopula rufisalsa (Warren, 1897)
Scopula rufistigma (Warren, 1895)
Scopula rufolutaria (Mabille, 1900)
Scopula rufomixtaria (Graslin, 1863)
Scopula rufotinctata (Prout, 1913)

S

Scopula sacraria (Bang-Haas, 1910)
Scopula sagittilinea (Warren, 1897)
Scopula sanguinifissa Herbulot, [1956]
Scopula sanguinisecta (Warren, 1897)
Scopula saphes Prout, 1920
Scopula sapor (Druce, 1910)
Scopula sarcodes Prout, 1935
Scopula sarfaitensis Wiltshire, 1982
Scopula sauteri Prout, 1922
Scopula scalercii Hausmann, 2003
Scopula scialophia Prout, 1919
Scopula scotti Debauche, 1937
Scopula sebata D. S. Fletcher, 1958
Scopula seclusa Herbulot, 1972
Scopula seclusoides Herbulot, 1978
Scopula sedataria (Leech, 1897)
Scopula segregata Prout, 1919
Scopula semignobilis Inoue, 1942
Scopula semispurcata (Warren, 1898)
Scopula semitata (Prout, 1913)
Scopula sentinaria (Geyer, 1837)
Scopula separata (Walker, 1875)
Scopula seras Prout, 1938
Scopula serena Prout, 1920
Scopula serratilinea (Warren, 1907)
Scopula sevandaria (Swinhoe, 1904)
Scopula seydeli Prout, 1934
Scopula shiskensis (Matsumura, 1925)
Scopula siccata McDunnough, 1939
Scopula sideraria (Guenée, [1858])
Scopula silonaria (Guenée, [1858])
Scopula similata (Le Cerf, 1924)
Scopula simplificata Prout, 1928
Scopula sincera (Warren, 1901)
Scopula sinnaria (Swinhoe, 1904)
Scopula sinopersonata (Wehrli, 1932)
Scopula sjostedti Djakonov, 1936
Scopula sordaria Karisch, 2001
Scopula sordida (Warren, 1895)
Scopula sparsipunctata (Mabille, 1900)
Scopula spectrum (Prout, 1923)
Scopula spinosicrista Herbulot, 1992
Scopula spissitarsata (Warren, 1899)
Scopula spoliata (Walker, 1861)
Scopula stenoptera Prout, 1922
Scopula stenoptila (Prout, 1916)
Scopula stephanitis Prout, 1932
Scopula stigmata (Moore, 1888)
Scopula straminea (Felder & Rogenhofer, 1875)
Scopula subaequalis (Prout, 1917)
Scopula subcandida Prout, 1938
Scopula subcarnea Prout, 1934
Scopula subdecorata (Warren, 1896)
Scopula subgastonaria Wiltshire, 1982
Scopula sublinearia (Walker, 1866)
Scopula sublobata (Warren, 1898)
Scopula sublutescens Prout, 1920
Scopula submutata (Treitschke, 1828)
Scopula subnictata (Snellen, 1874)
Scopula subobliquata (Prout, 1913)
Scopula subpartita Prout, 1919
Scopula subpectinata (Prout, 1915)
Scopula subperlaria (Warren, 1897)
Scopula subpulchellata Prout, 1920
Scopula subpunctaria (Herrich-Schäffer, 1847)
Scopula subquadrata (Guenée, [1858])
Scopula subrubellata Sterneck, 1941
Scopula subserena Wiltshire, 1990
Scopula subtaeniata (Bastelberger, 1908)
Scopula subtilata (Christoph, 1867)
Scopula subtracta Prout, 1935
Scopula succrassula Prout, 1931
Scopula suda Prout, 1932
Scopula suffecta Prout, 1938
Scopula suffundaria (Walker, 1861)
Scopula suna Prout, 1934
Scopula superciliata (Prout, 1913)
Scopula superior (Butler, 1878)
Scopula supernivearia Inoue, 1963
Scopula supina Prout, 1920
Scopula sybillaria (Swinhoe, 1902)
Scopula synethes (Turner, 1922)
Scopula szechuanensis (Prout, 1913)

T

Scopula tahitiensis Orhant, 2003
Scopula taifica Wiltshire, 1982
Scopula takao Inoue, 1954
Scopula tanalorum Herbulot, 1972
Scopula technessa Prout, 1932
Scopula tenera (Warren, 1899)
Scopula tensipallida Prout, 1938
Scopula tenuimargo (Prout, 1916)
Scopula tenuimedia Prout, 1938
Scopula tenuiscripta Prout, 1917
Scopula tenuisocius Inoue, 1942
Scopula tenuispersata (Fuchs, 1902)
Scopula terminata (Wiltshire, 1966)
Scopula ternata Schrank, 1802
Scopula terrearia (Mabille, 1900)
Scopula tersicallis Prout, 1929
Scopula tessellaria (Boisduval, 1840)
Scopula thrasia Prout, 1938
Scopula thysanopus (Turner, 1908)
Scopula timandrata (Walker, 1861)
Scopula timboensis Prout, 1938
Scopula timia (Prout, 1916)
Scopula toquilla (D. S. Fletcher, 1978)
Scopula tornisecta (Prout, 1916)
Scopula tosariensis Prout, 1923
Scopula toxophora Prout, 1919
Scopula traducta Prout, 1938
Scopula transmeata (Prout, 1931)
Scopula transsecta (Warren, 1898)
Scopula trapezistigma Prout, 1938
Scopula tricommata (Warren, 1899)
Scopula trisinuata (Warren, 1897)
Scopula tsekuensis Prout, 1935
Scopula tumiditibia Prout, 1920
Scopula turbidaria (Hübner, [1819])
Scopula turbulentaria (Staudinger, 1870)

U-V

Scopula uberaria (Zerny, 1933)
Scopula umbelaria (Hübner, [1813])
Scopula umbilicata (Fabricius, 1794) – swag-lined wave
Scopula umbratilinea (Warren, 1901)
Scopula undilinea (Warren, 1900)
Scopula undulataria (Moore, 1888)
Scopula unicornata (Warren, 1900)
Scopula unilineata (Warren, 1896)
Scopula unisignata Prout, 1926
Scopula urnaria (Guenée, [1858])
Scopula usticinctaria (Walker, 1861)
Scopula uvarovi (Wiltshire, 1952)
Scopula vacuata (Guenée, [1858])
Scopula valentinella Karisch, 2001
Scopula variabilis (Butler, 1878)
Scopula vicina (Thierry-Mieg, 1907)
Scopula vicina (Gaede, 1917)
Scopula viettei Herbulot, 1992
Scopula vigensis Prout, 1938
Scopula vigilata (Prout, 1913)
Scopula vinocinctata (Guenée, [1858])
Scopula violacea (Warren, 1897)
Scopula virgulata ([Denis & Schiffermüller], 1775)
Scopula vitellina Herbulot, 1978
Scopula vitiosaria (Swinhoe, 1904)
Scopula vittora (Schaus, 1901)
Scopula vojnitsi Inoue, 1992
Scopula voluptaria Prout, 1938

W-Z

Scopula walkeri (Butler, 1883)
Scopula wegneri Prout, 1935
Scopula wittei Debauche, 1938
Scopula xanthocephalata (Guenée, [1858])
Scopula xanthomelaena D. S. Fletcher, 1957
Scopula yamanei Inoue, 1978
Scopula yihe Yang, 1978
Scopula zophodes Prout, 1935

Status unknown
Scopula gyalararia (Franzenau, 1856), described as Acidalia gyalararia from Siebenburgen.
Scopula voeltzkowi Prout, 1934, described from Africa.

Web of life

Scopula species are used as a food source by various predators, including:
 Family Ichneumonoidea (Hymenoptera)
Aleiodes coxalis Spinola, 1808
Aleiodes tashimai Kusigemati, 1983
Aoplus defraudator Wesmael, 1845
Cotesia perspicua Nees, 1834
Homolobus (Oulophus) flagitator Curtis, 1837
Hoplismenus axillatorius Thunberg, 1822
Hyposoter thuringiacus Schmiedeknecht, 1909
Phobocampe crassiuscula Gravenhorst, 1829
Pristicerops infractorius Linnaeus, 1761
 Family Chalcidoidea (Hymenoptera)
Euplectrus gopimohani Mani, 1941

References

  2009: DNA barcoding confirms species rank for a cryptic geometrid species from Turkey and Bulgaria (Lepidoptera: Geometridae: Sterrhinae). Zootaxa, 2314: 63–68. Abstract & excerpt.
 , 1997: Scopula immistaria beshkovi ssp.n. - neu für Bulgarien und den Balkan (Lepidoptera, Geometridae). Linzer Biologische Beiträge 29 (2): 983–990.
  2003: New Sterrhinae from Europe, North Africa, and the Caucasus (Lepidoptera: Geometridae). Entomologische Zeitschrift 113 (11): 319–328.
 , 1999: New Geometridae from Bioko Island, Equatorial Guinea (Lepidoptera, Geometridae). Nouvelle Revue d'Entomologie 16 (2): 147–153.
 , 2003: Deuxième contribution à la connaissance des Lépidoptères Hétérocères de Tahiti avec quelques données pour Moorea. Bulletin de la Société Entomologique de Mulhouse 59 (2): 22–33.

Biodiversity and Conservation 14: 703–721.

External links

 
Scopulini
Geometridae genera
Taxa named by Franz von Paula Schrank